USCGC Isaac Mayo is a  homeported in Key West, Florida.
She is the twelfth Sentinel class to be delivered, and the sixth of six to be assigned to Key West.

Like her sister ships, she is equipped for coastal security patrols, interdiction of drug and people smugglers, and search and rescue. Like the smaller  she is equipped with a stern launching ramp. The ramp allows the deployment and retrieval of her high speed water-jet powered pursuit boat without first coming to a stop.

Operational history

On April 4, 2016, Isaac Mayo intercepted a small boat with twenty-two Cuban refugees on board.  The refugees had gone off course, and had entered Bahamas territory.

Namesake

She is named after Isaac Mayo, who served a surfman at a lifeboat station on Cape Cod.
Mayo was an employee of the United States Life-Saving Service, one of the precursor services that were amalgamated into the Coast Guard.

References

Sentinel-class cutters
Ships of the United States Coast Guard
2015 ships
Ships built in Lockport, Louisiana